Moses Melchior (1736–1817) was a Jewish-Danish merchant. He founded the trading house Moses & Søn G. Melchior.

Biography
Moses Melchior was born in Hamburg, the son of Marcus Melchior and Zippora Rosbach. He first visited Copenhagen in about 1750 to establish connections for his merchant father and moved there on a permanent basis in 1760. For the first 20 years he dealt mainly with tobacco from the Netherlands and Bremen, partly in partnership with his brother-in-law Akiba Jakobsen. He later founded the trading house Moses & Søn G. Melchior. By 1790 he traded on the Danish West Indies.

Further reading
 Martin-Meyer,Povl : Moses & Søn G. Melchior

References

Danish merchants
18th-century Danish businesspeople
Businesspeople from Copenhagen
Businesspeople from Hamburg
German emigrants to Denmark
1736 births
1817 deaths
Jews from Hamburg
18th-century German Jews
19th-century Jews
Danish Jews